Cardinal is a table grape variety first produced in California in 1939. 

The grape is a cross of the Königin der Weingärten and Ribier table grapes, according to latest research. In the United States, Bulgaria, North Macedonia, Croatia, France, Italy, Romania, Spain, and Portugal the grape is used as a typical table grape for eating and making raisins. In Thailand and Vietnam it is used widely in wine production. It is the main parent of the Blanc du Bois subtropical wine grape.

The cultivation of the variety was introduced in the Philippines in the 1970s where it is mainly grown in the Ilocos region.

References 

Table grape varieties